Luciano Rebay (April 23, 1928 – July 14, 2014), known especially for his work on the poet Giuseppe Ungaretti, was one of the leading post-war critics of Italian literature in America.

Rebay had a long affiliation with Columbia University, where he was the Giuseppe Ungaretti Professor of Italian and, from 2005 until his death, the Giuseppe Ungaretti professor emeritus.

Bibliography

 Le origini della poesia di Giuseppe Ungaretti, Ed. di Storia e Letteratura, 1962
 Italian poetry : a selection from St. Francis of Assisi to Salvatore Quasimodo in Italian with English translation / selection, introduction, biographical and critical notes, translations by Luciano Rebay. -- New York : Dover, 1971
 Correspondance G. Ungaretti - J. Paulhan, Paris, Gallimard, 1989 (with J. Paulhan & [[:fr:Jean-Charles Vegliante|J.-Ch. Vegliante]]), Cahiers J. Paulhan

References

Profile on Columbia University Website

2014 deaths
Columbia University faculty
1928 births